Bergeggi is an island which lies in the Ligurian Sea off the coast near the village of Bergeggi in the Province of Savona, Liguria, Italy.

Geography 
The island is around 8 hectares and its highest point is at 53 m.
Punta Predani, a promontory on the mainland, is just a few hundreds metres from the island.

History 

The island bears evidences of a proto-historical Ligures' settlement. On its summit stands a watch tower and remains of a 4th-century church devoted to St. Eugenius.

In 992 the bishop of Savona established a monastery on the island, also devoted to the saint, which was later donated to Lérins Abbey's monks. The monastery's ruins are still visible on the island.

Nature conservation 
The island with its surrounding marine area is protected as Riserva naturale regionale di Bergeggi, established in 1985 by the Legge Regionale Liguria n. 10 - Istituzione della riserva naturale regionale di Bergeggi. It is also included in a SIC (Site of Community Importance) called Isola Bergeggi - Punta Predani (code  IT1323202).

Among many interesting species living in the maquis shrubland covering most of the small island there are Campanula sabatia and  Euphorbia dendroides.

Bibliography 
 Leali Rizzi, Tina. Penco, Adriano. Liguria in blu - Guida alle immersioni subacquee da Ventimiglia a La spezia. Le Mani-Microart'S, 2001. .
 A.Maestri. Il culto di San Colombano in Italia. Archivio storico di Lodi. 1939 e segg.
 Archivum Bobiense Rivista annuale degli Archivi storici Bobiensi (1979–2008). Bobbio
 Mons. Antonio Giustiniani Annali della Repubblica di Genova Terza Edizione Genovese Vol.1 1854. Genova.
 Attilio Zuccagni-Orlandini Corografia fisica, storica e statistica dell'Italia e delle sue Isole Volume Duodecimo. 1842. Firenze.

See also 
 Italian Riviera
 List of islands of Italy

References

Islands of Liguria
Uninhabited islands of Italy
Ligurian Sea
Natura 2000 in Italy